Hangin' with Smooth is an album by drummer Cecil Brooks III, recorded in 1990 and released on the Muse label.

Reception

The Star-Ledger praised the "mix of hard-bopped standards, smooth ballads and smart, catchy originals." The Boston Herald listed Hangin' with Smooth among the 10 best jazz albums of 1992.

The AllMusic review by Scott Yanow stated that "this is an excellent modern mainstream set by some of the finest young lions of the 1990s."

Track listing
All compositions by Cecil Brooks III except where noted.
 "Hangin' with Smooth" – 5:13
 "I've Grown Accustomed to Her Face" (Frederick Loewe, Alan Jay Lerner) – 7:39	
 "Swamp Thang" – 8:36
 "Adreena" – 5:14
 "Don't Forget the Forgotten" (Radam Schwartz) – 7:39
 "Midnight Sun" (Lionel Hampton, Sonny Burke, Johnny Mercer) – 4:05
 "I'm a Fool to Want You" (Joel Herron, Jack Wolf, Frank Sinatra) – 3:11
 "Autumn in New York" (Vernon Duke) – 2:36
 "Invisible Face" (Schwartz) – 6:57
 "Healing Rhythms for Adriane" – 2:01

Personnel
Cecil Brooks III – drums
Phillip Harper – trumpet
Justin Robinson – alto saxophone
Craig Handy – tenor saxophone
Benny Green  – piano 
Peter Washington – bass
Kenneth Davis – electric bass (track 4)

References

Muse Records albums
Cecil Brooks III albums
1992 albums